Richard Earl Cunha (March 4, 1922 – September 18, 2005) was an American cinematographer and film director. Cunha's father was Albert "Sonny" Cunha, an American songwriter.

During World War II, Cunha served as an aerial photographer for the military, and then was transferred to Hal Roach Studios in Los Angeles, where he made military training films, newsreels and documentaries.

After the war, Cunha worked as a TV photographer, eventually working his way to up director of photography for the TV shows Death Valley Days and Branded.

Cunha wrote and directed only a handful of films, with his four best-known ones all being low-budget, sci fi-horror B-movies released in 1958 by Astor Pictures -- Giant from the Unknown, She Demons, Missile to the Moon, and Frankenstein's Daughter.

In an interview with The Astounding B Monster Archive, Cunha said his low-budget films had "budgets [that] were under $80,000, and we tried very hard to bring them in for approximately $65,000 or less," that the "shooting schedules were always six days," and "you don't run over on these low-budget films - you shoot the opening scenes and the end scenes, and then fill in the picture in between."

Selected filmography

As cinematographer

 Red Rock Outlaw  1950
 Death Valley Days (TV) 1952 
 Giant from the Unknown 1958 
 Bloodlust! 1961 
 The Silent Witness 1964 
 Le Proscrit (TV) 1965

As director

 She Demons with Irish McCalla, Ted Griffin, Victor Sen Yung, Rudolph Anders. 1958
 Giant from the Unknown with Ed Kemmer, Sally Fraser, Buddy Baer 1958
 Missile to the Moon with Richard Travis, Cathy Downs, K.T. Stevens, Tommy Cook. 1958
 Frankenstein's Daughter) with John Ashley, Sandra Knight, Donald Murphy, Sally Todd, Harold Lloyd. 1958
 Girl in Room 13. 1960
 Dog Eat Dog. 1964

As writer
 She Demons. 1958
 Girl in Room 13. 1960

References

External links
 
 Richard E. Cunha, 83; Directed Cult-Status '50s Horror Movies (Los Angeles Times, October 3, 2005)

1922 births
2005 deaths
American cinematographers
People from Oceanside, California
United States Army Air Forces personnel of World War II
United States Army Air Forces soldiers
Science fiction film directors